Kamil Papoušek (born 29 March 1977) is a Czech equestrian. He competed in the individual jumping event at the 2020 Summer Olympics.

References

External links
 

1977 births
Living people
Czech male equestrians
Olympic equestrians of the Czech Republic
Equestrians at the 2020 Summer Olympics
Place of birth missing (living people)
Show jumping riders